Muisca people (a tautology; "Muisca" means people in Muysccubun) are indigenous people in Colombia.

Muisca may also refer to:

 Muisca Confederation, the former country formed by the Muisca
 Chibcha language, the language of the Muisca, also called "Muisca", "Mosca" or "Muysccubun"
 Muisca (genus), a checkered beetle genus
 Muisca bitaeniata, the type species of this genus
 Muisca cylindricollis, another species in this genus
 Alabagrus muisca, a species of wasp of the genus Alabagrus
 Atelopus muisca, a species of toad of the genus Atelopus
 Brachygasterina muisca, a species of fly of the genus Brachygasterina
 Euryomma muisca, a species of fly of the genus Euryomma